Kill devil may refer to:

 Kill Devil, a Japanese film
 Kill Devil Hills, the site of the Wright Brothers National Memorial in North Carolina, U.S. 
 Kill-Devil, a slang term for rum